Jimmy DeLoach Parkway is a  parkway in the U.S. state of Georgia. It is located a few miles northwest of the main part of Savannah. The parkway has a concurrency with SR 17. It is a road that links US 80/SR 17 Conn./SR 26 in Bloomingdale with SR 21 Alt./SR 21/SR 30 in Port Wentworth. It also has an interchange with Interstate 95 (I-95). It was named after Jimmy DeLoach, former mayor of Garden City and Chatham County commissioner for District 7.

In 2016, an extension and renovation project of the parkway was proposed, and construction started in 2016 and finished in late 2022. The construction has extended the parkway into Bloomingdale Road and I-16, and the at-grade intersection with US 80 has been converted into a full diamond interchange.

Route description
The parkway starts after Little Neck Road at the exit 152 diamond interchange on I-16 in the western part of Bloomingdale. It then intersects US-80 / SR-26 / US-17 with another diamond interchange, and SR 17 joins the highway. The parkway then heads to the northeast, and then curves to the north-northeast. It makes a gradual curve to the east-northeast. Just west of Towler Road, it begins a curve to the northeast and then leaves Bloomingdale and enters the northern part of Pooler. After curving back to the east-northeast, the parkway leaves Pooler just east of an intersection with the southern terminus of Triple B Trail and enters the far northwestern part of Savannah. It curves to the northeast and then to the southeast just before an interchange with exit 106 on Interstate 95 (I-95). The parkway then begins a curve back to the east-northeast just before an intersection with Crossroads Parkway. It travels on a bridge over some railroad tracks of Norfolk Southern Railway and then on another bridge over some railroad tracks of CSX. Just east of an intersection with the northern terminus of Portside Court and the southern terminus of Logistics Way, the parkway curves to the southeast. A short distance later, it curves back to the east-northeast. On the Savannah–Port Wentworth line, it travels on a bridge over some railroad tracks of CSX and SR 21/SR 30. The parkway then enters Port Wentworth proper and has an interchange with SR 21 Alternate (SR 21 Alt.; Sonny Dixon Interchange / Jimmy DeLoach Connector). Here, SR 17 and the parkway's mainline ends, and the roadway continues as the connector.

History

Between the beginning of 1986 and the beginning of 1990, the roadway that would eventually become part of the parkway was established as Godley Road between US 80/SR 26 in the northern part of Bloomingdale to SR 21/SR 30 in the central part of Port Wentworth. By the beginning of 1993, a revamping of this road was proposed from SR 17 in the southwestern part of Bloomingdale to SR 21/SR 30 just north of its eastern terminus. However, by the beginning of 1997, this plan was canceled. In 2017, it was planned to extended Jimmy DeLoach Parkway from its current southern terminus at US 80/SR 17/SR 26, partially along the path of Bloomingdale Road (from SR 17's current southern terminus at I-16 to just south of its intersection with the northern terminus of Pine Barren Road). Construction on the extension began in 2018 and finished in late 2022.

Namesake
James "Jimmy" DeLoach was a Democrat. He served three terms as Mayor of Garden City from 1973 to 1979. In 1980, he was elected to a four-year term as Chatham County commissioner for District 7. He was re-elected in 1984 and 1988. He did not run for re-election in 1992. His son Eddie, who is a Republican, succeeded him; and went on to become the 66th Mayor of Savannah.

Major intersections

See also

References

Further reading
 
 
 
 
 

Transportation in Chatham County, Georgia
Roads in Savannah, Georgia